Saida, Saidah (Arabic: سَعِيدة saʽīdah) also spelled Sayda, Saeeda, or Sayeeda, is the female form of the Arabic male given name Sa‘id. 

Saida is a Japanese surname but not related to the Arabic given name. 

It may refer to:

Arabic name 
 Saida Agrebi, Tunisian politician
Saida Charaf, Sahrawi Moroccan singer
Saida Gunba, Soviet athlete
Saida Karoli, Tanzanian singer
Saida Miller Khalifa, British author
Saida Muna Tasneem, a Bangladeshi diplomat
Sayeeda Warsi, Baroness Warsi, British lawyer and politician

Japanese 

 Haruko Saida, women's professional shogi player

Arabic feminine given names